Hong Kong
   Leung Yuk Tong (梁玉堂)
   Lee Wai Tong (李惠堂)
   Yiu Cheuk Yin (姚卓然)
  Ho Cheung Yau, MBE (何祥友)
   Wong Chi Keung (黃志強)
   Wong Man Wai (黃文偉) (1967–69), (1972–82)
   Chan Kwok Hung (陳國雄) (1972–78)
   Kwok Kam Hung (郭錦洪)
  Choi York Yee (蔡育瑜) (1973–78), (1980–83)
  Chan Sai Kau (陳世九) (1968–78)
  Fung Chi Ming (馮志明)
  Sze Kin Hei (施建熙)
  Wu Kwok Hung (胡國雄) (1971–72)
  Ku Kam Fai (顧錦輝) (1984–99)
  Wan Chi Keung (尹志強)
  Cheung Chi Tak (張志德) (1984–87)
  Chan Fat Chi (陳發枝)
   Tim Bredbury (巴貝利) (1985–88)
     Leslie Santos (山度士) (1980–98)
   Dale Tempest (譚拔士) (1989–91)
    Richard Lant Armstrong (岩士唐) (1991–92), (1994–95)
   Shum Kwok Pui (岑國培) (1986-05)
   Lee Kin Wo (李健和) (1995-03)
   Au Wai Lun (歐偉倫) (1993–99), (1999-07)
   Yau Kin Wai (丘建威) (1995-05)
    Cheng Siu Chung (鄭兆聰) (1996), (1998-00), (2001–02)
   Sung Linyung (宋連勇) (1993–97)
   Cristiano Cordeiro (高尼路) (1998-03)

Austria
  Franz Blizenec (1998)
Australia
   Robbie Dunn (鄧尼) (1989–90)
  Ross Greer (基亞) (1990–92)
  George Haniotis (漢尼迪) (1992–93)
  Steve Hickman (希文) (1993–94)
  David Clarkson (卡臣) (1994–95)
  Kris Trajanovski (卓真洛奇) (1994–95)
  Stephen Aravena (艾維拉) (1995–96)
   Andrew Barisic (2013–14)
Belgium
  Peter Geraerts (彼德) (1997–98)
Bosnia and Herzegovina
   Anto Grabo (基保) (1992–95)
  Alen Bajkusa (巴古沙) (1993–94), (1995–96)
  Saša Kajkut (2013–14)
Brazil
  Rodrigues Neto (尼圖)
  da Silva Aurelio (奧拿里奧) (1995–98)
  Ailton Grigorio de Araujo (阿拉烏蘇) (1998-00)
  José Ricardo Rambo (列卡度) (1998–99)
  Aderbal Pericles Farias Filho (仙奴) (2000–02)
  Detinho (迪天奴) (2006–09), (2014–15)
  Sidraílson (沙域臣) (2007–09), (2009–10)
  Itaparica (伊達) (2007–08), (2012–13), (2014–2015)
  Maxwell (麥士維) (2007–08), (2008)
  Cacá (卡卡) (2009)
  Ramón (雷文) (2009)
  Leandro Carrijó (卡尼祖) (2009), (2010), (2012)
Canada
  Paris Nakajima-Farran (中島法蘭) (2011–12)
China
  He Jia (何佳) (1983–86)
  Chang Weikang (張惠康) (1991–92)
   Wu Qunli (吳群立) (1993–98)
  Gong Lei (宮磊) (1997–98)
  Zhang Enhua (張恩華) (2005–06)
  Du Ping (杜蘋) (2007)
Denmark
  Carsten Nielsen (黎路臣) (1981-82)
  Graham Easter (依士達) (1997–98)
  Jeppe Larson (拿臣) (1997–98)
Ecuador
  Félix Borja (2016)
England
  Keith Robson (基夫笠臣) (1983)
  Chris Lynam (拉南) (1983–85)
  Tommy Langley (連尼) (1985–86)
 Barry Powell (包維) (1985–86)
  Trevor Morgan (摩根) (1991–93)
  Steve Neville (尼福) (1991–93) 
  Brian McDermott (麥達莫) (1992–93)
  Billy Whitehurst (韋靴斯) (1992–93)
  Fenippe Anderson (安德遜) (1996–97)
  Iain Hesford (希福特) (1997–98)
  Mike Leonard (李安納) (1998-00)
  Nicky Butt (畢特) (2010–11)
Germany
 Klaus-Dieter Jank (楊確) (1981-83)
Indonesia
 Rochy Putiray (佩迪里) (2002–03)
Malaysia
  Chow Chee Keong (仇志強) (1971–74)
  Chan Kwok Leung (陳國良)

Netherlands 
  Cees Storm (史唐) (1982–83)
  Arie Haan (海恩) (1984)
  Werner Kooistra (威拿) (1993–97) 
  Marcel Leisdek (馬些路) (1993–95)
   Marlon Ricardo van der Sander (尹迪辛達) (1993–94)
  Dennis Koffyberg (哥夫) (1993–94)
  Neils Gerestein (卓斯) (1993–94)
  Ad Roos (路殊) (1993–94)
  Piet Drommel (杜武) (1994)
 New Zealand
  Robert Ironside (艾朗西) (1995-96)
 Northern Ireland
  Chris McGrath (麥格夫) (1983–85)
  Allen McKnight (麥禮) (1992–94)
Paraguay
   Gerardo Laterza (謝利) (1999-01)
Portugal
  Pedro Xavier (沙維亞) (1995–98)
Scotland
  Billy Semple (森寶) (1982–83)
  Alex Miller (米勒) (1983)
  Walker McCall (麥哥) (1983) 
  Willie Johnston (韋利莊士東) (1983)
  Derek Parlane (柏蘭尼) (1985–86)
  Max Christie (基斯迪) (1992–93)
  Frank McAvennie (麥艾雲尼) (1992–93)
  Lee Bullen (李布倫) (1997)
Singapore
  Edmund Wee (黃文財) (1981–83), (1984–88)  
Slovakia
  Martin Jancula (甄馬田) (2001–02)
South Africa
  John Paskin (柏斯堅) (1984-85)
South Korea
  Kim Yeon-Gun (金永健) (2009)
Sweden
  Joakim Grandelius (格烈治) (1997–98)
  Thomas Walfridsson (華域臣) (1997–98)
Togo
   Cris (基斯) (2006–07), (2007–09)
Trinidad and Tobago
  Thomas Sheldon (施頓) (1997–98)
Venezuela
  Fernando de Ornelas (奧尼拉斯) (1998–99), (2000–01)
Former Yugoslavia (current Serbia)
  Marko Perinović (柏連奴域) (1993–94)
  Radislav Ignjić (拉迪斯拉夫) (1996–98)
  Željko Rolović (洛奴域) (1996–97)
  Željko Gavrilović (加連奴域) (1999-01)
  Mateja Kežman (基士文) (2011), (2012)

 
South China AA
Association football player non-biographical articles